Sigam is a village in the district of Bharuch, in the Indian state of Gujarat.

Villages in Bharuch district